Kristiansand Station  is a railway station located in downtown Kristiansand in Agder county, Norway.  The station, located along the Sørlandet Line, is served by regional trains to Oslo and Stavanger. Kristiansand Station is a cul-de-sac station, requiring all trains to change direction at the station.  The station is owned by the state-owned company Bane NOR.

History
The station was opened in 1895 as part of the now abandoned Setesdal Line from Kristiansand to Byglandsfjord. The station was the only station on the line to be built with bricks, due to local regulations after the city fire in 1892. Like all other stations on the line, the station was designed by Paul Due.

In 1937, Norsk Spisevognselskap agreed to take over operations of the restaurant when the Sørland Line was completed to Kristiansand. Operations started on 16 June 1938, a week before the line opened. On 9 December 1940, the company decided to invest  in a new restaurant building at the station. It was taken into use on 28 November 1942.

References

Buildings and structures in Kristiansand
Railway stations on the Sørlandet Line
Railway stations in Agder
Railway stations opened in 1895
1895 establishments in Norway
Transport in Kristiansand